was a Japanese samurai of the late Edo period, who served the Makino clan of Nagaoka. He studied under Sakuma Shōzan.

Kobayashi was a senior leader of Nagaoka after the Boshin War of 1868–69, and was the instrumental figure in the Kome Hyappyo incident.

References 

1828 births
1877 deaths
People from Nagaoka Domain
People of the Boshin War
Samurai
Meiji Restoration